The February 6–8, 2021 nor'easter, also referred to as the 2021 Super Bowl Sunday nor'easter, was a strong and fast-moving nor'easter that started out in the Southern United States, before impacting the Mid-Atlantic and New England states on Super Bowl Sunday, in February 2021. The storm struck the region just days after another significant nor'easter impacted the same general regions. Developing on February 6 along a stationary front in the Southern United States and moving northeastward, the imminent impacts from the nor'easter forced several vaccination sites in the Northeast to temporarily close again for the following days. The storm caused one indirect death, and damage estimates are currently undetermined. It was unofficially named Winter Storm Quade by The Weather Channel.

Meteorological history

An upper-level disturbance moved eastwards through the Tennessee Valley on February 6, leading to the development of a weak area of low pressure along a stationary front off the coast of Florida later that night. As the storm was expected to strike the Northeastern United States around the day of the Super Bowl, the storm was given the nickname "Super Bowl Sunday Nor'easter". On February 7, the storm emerged into the Atlantic and developed into a nor'easter. The system grew more powerful as it moved northeastward, with the storm's central pressure reaching  at 21:00 UTC that day. On the same day, the nor'easter developed strong mesoscale banding from New Jersey to southeastern Massachusetts, resulting in much higher snowfall rates in those areas than initially forecasted.

Afterward, the storm gradually began to weaken as it began moving away from the Canadian coastline. On the next day, the system received the name Wolfram from the Free University of Berlin. Over the next couple of days, the storm slowly out into the open Atlantic, before stalling briefly on February 12. On the next day, the storm began moving northeastward towards Iceland, before stalling for another two days, while another storm, Xanthos, began approaching from the south. On February 16, Xanthos absorbed the cyclone, between Greenland and Iceland.

Preparations and impact

Early on February 5, Winter Storm Watches were issued in the southern and central Appalachians, due to the upcoming storm. As the day progressed, these watches were extended from south to north along the Mid-Atlantic and New England coast, including Washington, D.C., Philadelphia, New York City, and Boston. The next day, Winter Storm Watches were upgraded to Winter Storm Warnings along the southern and central Appalachians, as well as along the Mid-Atlantic coast. Watches were expanded up into southern New England as well.

Northeastern United States
In Philadelphia, a snow emergency was declared ahead of the storm. PECO Energy Company activated their emergency response team and brought in additional crews to handle potential power outages.

In New Jersey, Governor Phil Murphy announced on February 6 that three COVID-19 vaccine megasites, in Burlington, Morris, and Middlesex Counties would be closed the following day, with appointments to be rescheduled to the following week. In New York City, the NYMTA grounded articulated buses for Sunday, February 7, 2021. Areas in Massachusetts prepared for the storm and issued parking bans on Sunday, February 7, ahead of the storm. On February 7, a 16-year-old girl was killed in Upstate New York, and a toddler was injured, in a sledding accident.

Atlantic Canada
Over  of snow fell in Halifax, Nova Scotia, causing widespread disruption in the city. Similarly disruptive amounts of snowfall were recorded across Nova Scotia, Prince Edward Island, and southern New Brunswick. Newfoundland saw a mix of rain, freezing rain, sleet, and snow. Municipal garbage collection was delayed, Canada Post had to postpone delivering packages, classes were cancelled, businesses and government offices closed and over 10,000 customers of Nova Scotia Power were affected by outages.

See also

 March 6–8, 2018 nor'easter
 January 2–4, 2014 North American blizzard
 February 9–11, 2017 North American blizzard
 February 12–14, 2017 North American blizzard

References

External links

 2021 Storm Summaries from the Weather Prediction Center

2020–21 North American winter
February 2021 events in North America
Nor'easters
Extratropical cyclones
2021 meteorology